1998 financial collapse may refer to:
 1998 Russian financial crisis
 The 1998 collapse of Long-Term Capital Management